Simula Research Laboratory (also known as Simula) is a Norwegian non-profit research organisation located in Oslo, Norway.

Simula was founded in 2001 by the Norwegian government to conduct fundamental, long-term research within information and communication technology (ICT). Simula's research is concentrated on five areas: communication systems, scientific computing, software engineering, cybersecurity, and machine learning.

In addition to conducting research at a high international level, Simula works to apply research in both industry and the public sector, and to educate graduate students and postdoctoral fellows in collaboration with partner universities, Norwegian and international.

As of 2020, the organisation includes six subsidiaries, employing over 155 employees from more than 35 countries. Through the Simula Garage (Norwegian: Gründergarasjen), Simula is also an incubator for entrepreneurs working in early-stage ICT-related startups.

Organization

Ownership
Simula Research Laboratory is registered as a limited company owned by the state and managed by the Norwegian Ministry of Education and Research. It is governed by a board of directors appointed by the owner. The board appoints a managing director (CEO), who, in turn, decides how Simula should operate daily. Professor Aslak Tveito has led Simula since 2002.

Simula companies
Since the establishment of Simula Research Laboratory in 2001, several subsidiaries have been created to organise Simula's activities in research, education and innovation. The group currently comprises six companies, spread over three locations in Norway. These companies are

 Simula Research Laboratory, established in 2001 and fully owned by the state, managed by the Norwegian Ministry of Education and Research. Simula is led by Professor Aslak Tveito. Simula Research Laboratory is currently located at Fornebu, Bærum, Norway, and will relocate to downtown Oslo in the fall of 2021.
 Simula UiB was jointly established in 2016 by Simula Research Laboratory and the University of Bergen (UiB). The center is led by Professor Carlos Cid and is located in downtown Bergen, Norway.
 Simula Metropolitan Center for Digital Engineering (SimulaMet) was jointly established by Simula Research Laboratory and Oslo Metropolitan University (OsloMet) in 2018. The center is led by Olav Lysne and is located at OsloMet's campus in downtown Oslo, Norway.
 The Simula School of Research and Innovation (SSRI) organises Simula's educational activities. SSRI is jointly owned by Simula, Equinor, the Municipality of Bærum, and Telenor. SSRI is led by Marianne Aasen and is co-located with Simula Research Laboratory at Fornebu.
 Simula's innovation and applied research activities are organised by its two wholly owned subsidiaries: Simula Innovation (led by Ottar Hovind) and Simula Consulting (led by Valeriya Naumova).
The Simula Garage] (Norwegian: "Gründergarasjen"), an incubator for entrepreneurs working on early-stage ICT-related startups, has two locations: one at Fornebu and one in downtown Oslo, in collaboration with Oslo Metropolitan University.

Funding
Simula is funded from several different sources. About 35% of Simula's funding is allocated in the form of basic funding and long-term projects from the Norwegian government, in particular from the Ministries of Education and Research, Local Government and Modernisation, Transport, and Justice and Public Security. The remaining 65% of funding is secured from external sources, mainly research grants from the European Union and the Research Council of Norway.

Name
Simula Research Laboratory is named after the programming language Simula, which was developed by the Norwegian scientists Kristen Nygaard and Ole-Johan Dahl. Both men received the A. M. Turing Award in 2001 and the IEEE John von Neumann Medal in 2002 for their contribution to the development of object-oriented programming.

Simula was named after the language to honour the outstanding scientific achievement of Nygaard and Dahl, and to encourage research that meets the highest standards of quality.

Activities 
Simula's main objective is to conduct basic and applied research and provide education in select areas of information and communications technology (ICT), thereby contributing to innovation in society.

Research
Simula conducts long-term, fundamental research in the following five fields: communication systems, scientific computing, software engineering, machine intelligence and cybersecurity. The research is focused on core challenges that combine technological development, with utility for industry and society overall.

Most of Simula's research on software engineering, scientific computing, and high-performance computing occurs at Simula Research Laboratory. Research on cybersecurity, cryptography, and information theory occurs at Simula UiB. Research on communication systems and machine learning occurs at SimulaMet.

Simula is host for the national infrastructure Experimental Infrastructure for Exploration of Exascale Computing (eX3), a national research infrastructure funded by the Research Council of Norway. The eX3 allows high-performance computing (HPC) researchers throughout Norway and their collaborators abroad to experiment hands-on with emerging HPC technologies: hardware and software.

Simula has hosted prior centres of excellence and innovation including the Centre for Biomedical Computing (a Center of Excellence; SFF) and Certus (a Center for Research-based Innovation; SFI), and been a partner in the Center for Cardiological Innovation and SIRIUS HPC. Currently Simula is a partner in ProCardio (Precision Health Center for optimised cardiac care; SFI).

Innovation
Simula's innovation and applied research activities are mainly organised through two wholly owned subsidiaries: Simula Consulting provides tailored training and R&D services in the core competence areas of Simula; Simula Innovation manages Simula's investment portfolio. As of 2020, Simula Innovation has a portfolio of 28 companies. In addition, Simula provides start-up development assistance through the Simula Garage.

Education
Through the Simula School of Research and Innovation (SSRI) and in collaboration with national and international degree-awarding institutions, Simula supervises master students, PhD students, and postdoctoral fellows. Simula annually supervises about 30 master students and 10 PhD students to the completion of their degree.

SSRI also organises and teaches many undergraduate and graduate-level courses at collaborating universities, mainly the University of Oslo, University of Bergen and Oslo Metropolitan University.

Major international collaborations
Simula and the University of California, San Diego (UCSD) collaborate on educating master- and PhD-students through the PhD program SUURPh, and through the joint Summer School in Computational Physiology (SSCP).

Simula also collaborates with the Technical University of Berlin (TU Berlin) on several PhD programs.

Continuing education offers
In addition to research education, Simula offers training to research fellows and scientists, to prepare them for careers in academia or industry, and offers professional development training such as programming courses for teachers; see e.g., KodeSkolen.

See also 
Aslak Tveito
Dag Sjøberg
Hans Petter Langtangen
Magne Jørgensen
Olav Lysne
Marianne Aasen
Simula

References

External links
 

Computer science institutes in Norway